Temara Melek Ellinger (born May 4, 1998 in Loveland, Colorado) is an American pop singer, model and actress. She collaborated with DJ Antoine on Go with your heart which charted in several European countries (including in Germany). She also released her own singles Fingerprints and Karma's Not Pretty. Temara has opened for Demi Lovato on the first 2vlive live streamed concert filmed at the Belasco Theatre in Los Angeles to over 2 million people. She has been previously linked to popular singer, Harry Styles as well as his band mate, Niall Horan.

Early life and education
Temara Melek was born May 4, 1998 to mother Tiffany Ellinger. She is the sister of actor Tarik Ellinger and Taylor Ellinger. Temara started singing at the age of four . At a young age, her family relocated to California.

Temara attended Oak Park Independent High School where she graduated 1 year early in order to attend the Fashion Institute of Design & Merchandising where she studied fashion design and merchandising.

Singing career
Temara started to take her singing seriously at the age of 13 when she co-wrote a song and did a music video featuring YouTuber Christian Beadles which amassed over 2 million views on YouTube.

Temara's career began when she and her friend Cassadee Pope (former lead singer of Hey Monday and winner of the third season of The Voice) co-wrote her first pop release Karma's Not Pretty. The song itself reached #8 in the UK's Most Watched Music Video charts, and #10 in the VIVA online charts; and was reviewed by OK! Magazine, MTV, The Independent, Huffington Post, Teen Mag, Girl Talk and The Hits Radio FM. This song also earned her the Academia Music Award for Best Pop Song in the 2013 ceremony. She also received an honorable mention at the 23rd Annual LA Music Awards. The music video for this single featured Gregg Sulkin and Keegan Allen from the TV show Pretty Little Liars.

The attention garnered from this single, led to her being selected by Demi Lovato's production staff to appear as a selected guest at her first live streamed concert in October 2013.

In 2014, Temara Melek was a part of Macy's iHeartRadio Rising Star talent search.

In the fall of 2014 she collaborated with DJ Antoine, a Swiss house, Electro DJ and producer from Basel, Switzerland providing vocals for his song 'Go With Your Heart', which charted in several European charts, including in Germany, Switzerland and Belgium. The lyric video for this song had reached almost 2 million viewers by early 2017.

Temaras music video for Fingerprints was exclusively released on Ryan Seacrest.com in 2015.

In the Summer of 2019, Temara will be releasing new music she has been working on with her writers and producers. Her single "Privacy" was created with LA Producer/songwriter Alessandro Calleme "AC Music Man"

She shared on Instagram that she is in a Relationship with fellow actress Danika Yarosh

Musical influences and style
Temara has a vocal presence that is uniquely her own. Her musical influences are Little Mix, Cheryl Cole, Miley Cyrus and Ariana Grande.

Other endeavors
Temara Melek is also an actress and a model that has appeared in documentaries such as Standing Tall at Auschwitz and the TV series Modern Family, The Vampire Diaries, Westworld and most recently as a Salvatore Witch on Legacies. Modeling credits include NFL.com, Junkfood, MichaelMJewelry, Lovenailtree.com and others.

Discography

Singles

Filmography

Film

TV Shows

References

External links
 Official Website
 

Living people
1998 births
Caterogry:LGBT Actresses